The 36th International Emmy Awards took place on November 24, 2008, at the New York Hilton Midtown in New York City and hosted by American actor Roger Bart. The award ceremony, presented by the International Academy of Television Arts and Sciences (IATAS), honors all TV programming produced and originally aired outside the United States.

Ceremony 
The nominees for the 36th International Emmys were announced by the International Academy of Television Arts and Sciences (IATAS) on October 13, 2008 at a press conference at MIPCOM in Cannes, France. In all, 40 TV shows from 16 countries competed for the award in ten categories. The United Kingdom topped the list with eight nominations, followed by Brazil with six, Argentina and Japan with four, China and Denmark with three, Jordan and Peru with one nomination. The nominees were selected over six months by a panel of 600 judges representing around 50 countries.

The United Kingdom led the list with eight nominations, followed by Brazil with six, Argentina and Japan with four, China and Denmark with three, Jordan and Peru with one nomination. The nominees were selected over six months by a panel of 600 judges representing around 50 countries. This year, the International Academy awarded a telenovela for the first time, with the introduction of a new category, contested by The Invasion Igtiyah (Jordan), Lalola (Argentina), One Night of Love (Russia) and Paraíso Tropical (Brazil).

In addition to the presentation of the International Emmy Awards for programming, the Academy presented two special awards. The Founders Award was presented to Dick Wolf, (creator and executive producer of Law & Order) for his creative accomplishments over the last 25 years and for his international success with Law & Order. The Directorate Award was presented to Phoenix Satellite Television founder and chairman, Liu Changle, for growing Phoenix into a multimedia empire broadcasting in Mandarin in over 150 countries.

Presenters 
The following individuals, listed in order of appearance, presented awards.

Winners

Most major nominations 
By country
 — 8
 — 6

By network
Channel 4 — 5
Rede Globo — 4

Most major awards 
By country
 — 7

By network
Channel 4 — 4
BBC — 3

References

External links 
 
 36TH INTERNATIONAL EMMY® AWARDS NOMINEES
 INTERNATIONAL EMMY AWARD WINNERS ANNOUNCED

International Emmy Awards ceremonies
2008 television awards
2008 in American television